A religious denomination is a subgroup within a religion that operates under a common name and tradition among other activities.
The term refers to the various Christian denominations (for example, Eastern Orthodox, Catholic, and the many varieties of Protestantism). It is also used to describe the five major branches of Judaism (Karaite Judaism, Orthodox, Conservative, Reform, and Reconstructionist). Within Islam, it can refer to the branches or sects (such as Sunni, Shia), as well as their various subdivisions such as sub-sects, schools of jurisprudence, schools of theology and religious movements.

The world's largest religious denomination is  Sunni Islam.

Christianity 

A Christian denomination is a generic term for a distinct religious body identified by traits such as a common name, structure, leadership and doctrine. Individual bodies, however, may use alternative terms to describe themselves, such as church or fellowship. Divisions between one group and another are defined by doctrine and church authority; issues such as the biblical interpretation, the authority of apostolic succession, eschatology, and papal primacy often separate one denomination from another. Groups of denominations often sharing broadly similar beliefs, practices and historical ties are known as branches of Christianity.

Hinduism

In Hinduism, the major deity or philosophical belief identifies a denomination, which also typically has distinct cultural and religious practices. The major denominations include Shaivism, Shaktism, Vaishnavism and Smartism.

Islam

Historically, Islam was divided into three major sects well known as Sunni, Khawarij and Shi‘ah. Nowadays, Sunnis constitute about 90% of the overall Muslim population, the Shi'ahs are around 10%, while Ibadis, from the Kharijites, have diminished to a level below 0.15%.

Today, many of the Shia sects are extinct. The major surviving Imamah-Muslim Sects are Usulism (with nearly more than 8.5%), Nizari Ismailism (with nearly more than 1%), Alevism (with slightly more than 0.5% but less than 1%). The other existing groups include Zaydi Shi'a of Yemen whose population is nearly more than 0.5% of the world's Muslim population, Musta’li Ismaili  (with nearly 0.1% whose Taiyabi adherents reside in Gujarat state in India and Karachi city in Pakistan. There are also significant diaspora populations in Europe, North America, the Far East and East Africa).

On the other hand, new Muslim sects like African American Muslims, Ahmadi Muslims (with nearly around 1%), non-denominational Muslims, Quranist Muslims, and Wahhabis (with nearly around 0.5% of the world's total Muslim population) were later independently developed.

A survey by Pew Research Center suggests that up to 25% of Muslims globally self-identified as non-denominational Muslims.

Judaism

Jewish religious movements, sometimes called "denominations" or "branches", include different groups which have developed among Jews from ancient times. Today, the main division is between the Orthodox, Reform and Conservative lines, with several smaller movements alongside them. This threefold denominational structure is mainly present in the United States, while in Israel the fault lines are between the religious Orthodox and the non-religious.

The movements differ in their views on various issues. These issues include the level of observance, the methodology for interpreting and understanding Jewish law, biblical authorship, textual criticism and the nature or role of the messiah (or messianic age). Across these movements there are marked differences in liturgy, especially in the language in which services are conducted, with the more traditional movements emphasizing Hebrew. The sharpest theological division occurs between Orthodox and non-Orthodox Jews who adhere to other denominations, such that the non-Orthodox movements are sometimes referred to collectively as the "liberal denominations" or "progressive streams."

Multi-denominational
The term "multi-denominational" may describe (for example) a religious event that includes several religious denominations from sometimes unrelated religious groups. Many civic events include religious portions led by representatives from several religious denominations to be as inclusive or representational as possible of the expected population or audience.  For example: the Sunday thanksgiving mass at Campamento Esperanza (English: Camp Hope) in Chile, where services were led by both a Roman Catholic priest and by an Evangelical preacher during the Chilean 2010 Copiapó mining accident.

Chaplains - frequently ordained clergy of any religion - are often assigned to secular organizations to provide spiritual support to its members who may belong to any of many different religions or denominations.  Many of these chaplains, particularly those serving with the military or other large secular organizations, are specifically trained to minister to members of many different faiths, even faiths with opposing religious ideology from that of the chaplain's own faith.

Military organizations that do not have large numbers of members from several individual smaller but related denominations will routinely hold multi-denominational religious services, often generically called "Protestant" Sunday services, so minority Protestant denominations are not left out or unserved.

See also 
 Attempted schisms in the Baháʼí Faith
 Christian denomination
 Ecumenism
 Hindu denominations
 Interfaith dialogue
 Islamic schools and branches
 Jain schools and branches
 Jewish religious movements
 Mansions of Rastafari
 Non-denominational
 Religious syncretism
 Schism
 Schools of Buddhism
 Sects of Sikhism
 Shinto sects and schools
 Sociological classifications of religious movements
 Taoist schools

References

External links